First-seeded Helen Wills defeated Helen Jacobs 6–2, 6–1 in the final to win the women's singles tennis title at the 1928 U.S. National Championships. The event was held at the West Side Tennis Club, Forest Hills, New York City. It was Wills's fifth U.S. National singles title and her second in a row.

Seeds
The tournament assigned eight seeded players for the women's singles event. Helen Wills is the champion; others show in brackets the round in which they were eliminated.

  Helen Wills (champion)
  Molla Mallory (semifinals)
  Helen Jacobs (finalist)
  Edith Cross (semifinals)
  Charlotte Hosmer Chapin (quarterfinals)
  Marjorie Morrill (quarterfinals)
  Penelope Anderson (quarterfinals)
  May Sutton Bundy (third round)

Draw

Final eight

References

1928
1928 in women's tennis
1928 in American women's sports
Women's Singles
1928 in New York City
1928 in sports in New York (state)
Women's sports in New York (state)